Municipal Stadium is a multi-use stadium in Kralendijk, on the island of Bonaire.  It is currently used mostly for football matches.  The stadium holds 3,000 people.

Gallery

External links
Venue information

Athletics (track and field) venues in Bonaire
Football venues in Bonaire
Buildings and structures in Kralendijk